Nuno Jorge Nobre Barbosa Malheiro (born 1 February 1994) is a Portuguese professional footballer who plays as a left back.

Club career
On 29 July 2017 Malheiro made his professional debut with Zagłębie Sosnowiec in a 2017–18 I liga match against Olimpia Grudziądz.

References

External links

1994 births
Living people
Sportspeople from Cascais
Portuguese footballers
Association football defenders
Segunda Divisão players
Campeonato de Portugal (league) players
Ekstraklasa players
I liga players
G.D. Tourizense players
Juventude de Pedras Salgadas players
G.D. Vitória de Sernache players
Zagłębie Sosnowiec players
S.C. Espinho players
Sliema Wanderers F.C. players
Portugal youth international footballers
Portuguese expatriate footballers
Expatriate footballers in Poland
Portuguese expatriate sportspeople in Poland
Expatriate footballers in Malta
Portuguese expatriate sportspeople in Malta